Wire Service is an American television drama series that aired on ABC as part of its 1956–57 season lineup.

Synopsis
Wire Service focuses on three reporters for the fictional Trans Globe wire service, which was similar to (and obviously inspired by) real-life news wire services such as the Associated Press and United Press International. It was the first hour-long, weekly scheduled dramatic series with continuing characters to last a full season on network television. However, the three reporters functioned independently of each other, meaning that the series was essentially three different ones sharing a time slot and title.

This program was aired at 9 p.m. (Eastern Time) Thursdays from September 1956 to February 1957, when it was moved to Mondays at 8:30. It was not renewed for a second season, and the last prime time broadcast under this title was in September 1957.  However, when a gap developed in the ABC schedule in February 1959, the episodes starring Dane Clark (only) were then rebroadcast under the title Deadline for Action. The last of these repeat episodes was broadcast on September 13, 1959.

The program was produced by Desilu Productions at Desilu Studios in Hollywood, California.

The series sometimes delved into topics that were controversial for its era. They included profiteering, nuclear testing, and prison reform.

Cast
Dane Clark as Dan Miller
George Brent as Dean Evans
Mercedes McCambridge as Katherine Wells

The producers were Don Sharpe and Warren Lewis.

Home video
A DVD set, Wire Service Volume 1, was released by Alpha Video on March 1, 2016.

Episodes

See also

 The Name of the Game

References

External links
 
 Wire Service at CVTA
 "Chicago Exclusive" episode of Wire Service from YouTube
 "The Tower" episode of Wire Service from the Internet Archive
 "The Deep End" episode of Wire Service from the Internet Archive

1956 American television series debuts
1957 American television series endings
American Broadcasting Company original programming
1950s American drama television series
Black-and-white American television shows
English-language television shows
Television series by CBS Studios
Television series by Desilu Productions
Television series about journalism